Shamsa Cheema is a village in Daska Tehsil, Sialkot District,  Pakistan.

Villages in Sialkot District